Jerry Turkulainen (born 23 September 1998) is a Finnish professional ice hockey player who currently plays as a left wing for JYP Jyväskylä of the Liiga.

References

External links

1998 births
Living people
Finnish ice hockey left wingers
JYP Jyväskylä players
People from Mikkeli
Sportspeople from South Savo